The surname Bechdel refers to:
Alison Bechdel (born 1960), American cartoonist, known for the comic strip Dykes To Watch Out For

See also
Bechdel test, used to identify gender bias in fiction
Bechtel, the largest engineering company in the United States
Bechtel (surname)